The following is a list of the monastic houses in Wiltshire, England.

List

See also
 List of monastic houses in England

Notes

References

Medieval sites in England
 
Wiltshire
Wiltshire
Lists of buildings and structures in Wiltshire